Dvorska Vas is a village in the hills south of Velike Lašče in central Slovenia. The area is part of the traditional region of Lower Carniola and is now included in the Central Slovenia Statistical Region.

Name
In order records, the name of the village often appears without the v as Dorska vas (or Dorſkavaſs,  Dorſkavaſ).

Church
The local church is dedicated to the John the Baptist. It was built in 1722.

Notable people
Notable people that were born or lived in Dvorska Vas include:
Janez Modic (1846 – after 1892), beekeeper

References

External links

Dvorska Vas on Geopedia

Populated places in the Municipality of Velike Lašče